Alan Scott LeDoux, nicknamed "The Fighting Frenchman," (January 7, 1949 – August 11, 2011) was a politician, professional heavyweight boxer, professional wrestler, and referee.

Career

Boxing
LeDoux began his professional boxing career in 1974. His first boxing match was a knockout victory over Arthur Pullens.  LeDoux's final bout in 1983 was a technical knockout loss to Frank Bruno.  LeDoux retired from the ring with a record of 33-13-4 (including 22 knockouts).

LeDoux's opponents included  Ken Norton, Ron Lyle, Gerrie Coetzee, Leon Spinks, Greg Page, Frank Bruno, George Foreman, Mike Weaver, and Larry Holmes. In his match with Leon Spinks, LeDoux earned a 'draw', just months before Spinks defeated Ali.  He also knocked off broadcaster Howard Cosell's toupee in a scuffle that followed a losing effort with Johnny Boudreaux.  LeDoux insisted the fight was fixed by Don King and he ranted to Cosell to "Tell it like it is" mimicking Cosell's famous catch phrase.  A pushing match ensued and in the process, Cosell's headset along with his toupee was dislodged by an errant LeDoux shove in front of live ABC cameras.  Cosell quickly retrieved his hair from the floor and replaced it on top of his head.  LeDoux also took part in a five round exhibition match with Muhammad Ali.  LeDoux over the course of his career also sparred with Mike Tyson and Lennox Lewis.

LeDoux's best achievements were that he scored draws against Leon Spinks and an ageing Ken Norton, who won the first 8 rounds clear but then tired. But Scott nearly knocked out the past-his-peak Ken Norton in round ten, when after some confusion as to whether the ref had signalled the fight over or not it was declared a draw.

On April 22, 1976, LeDoux lost to fellow Minnesotan Duane Bobick before a crowd of 13,789, which is still a Minnesota record.

LeDoux later worked as a ringside commentator for ESPN and in 1986 as a referee for the American Wrestling Association.

It was announced on July 5, 2010 that LeDoux would be a member of the inaugural class of inductees to the Minnesota Boxing Hall of Fame.

Politics
LeDoux was elected to the Anoka County, Minnesota Board of County Commissioners and re-elected in 2008, defeating challenger Becky Fink.

In 2006, the Minnesota Legislature authorized the creation of a state Boxing Commission, the Minnesota Board of Boxing having gone out of existence in 2001 with the retirement of longtime Boxing Commissioner and Executive Secretary Jimmy O'Hara (LeDoux and O'Hara had served together on the Minnesota Board of Boxing for 18 years). LeDoux was appointed boxing commissioner by the state Governor Tim Pawlenty. In August 2006 LeDoux was also named Executive Director of the Minnesota Combative Sports Commission.

Controversy
 In 2007, the Chief Executive of the Mille Lacs Band of Ojibwe, Melanie Benjamin, objected to LeDoux's public criticism of her band and their boxing matches at the Grand Casino Hinckley Casino in Hinckley, Minnesota.
 In November 2007, LeDoux was accused by boxing promoter John Hoffman of "insulting and assaulting" him at a boxing event in Maplewood, Minnesota.  LeDoux claims that Hoffman was intoxicated and fabricated the story.
 In December 2008 a state investigation revealed that LeDoux, in his capacity as head of the Combative Sports Commission, accepted free tickets to an MMA event, some of which had a face value of $600.  This was determined to be a violation of state ethics rules.
 In January 2009, commission member Chad Ridler resigned in protest "of the inaction of the commission in providing oversight of Scott LeDoux...He's unaccountable".

Personal life
LeDoux was diagnosed with amyotrophic lateral sclerosis (ALS) or "Lou Gehrig's Disease" in August 2008. A 2010 study questioned the diagnosis in athletes who had experienced head trauma or repeated concussions. Instead, the study suggests that some may have a variant of dementia pugilistica, known as chronic traumatic encephalopathy or boxer's syndrome. LeDoux was a member of the national board of directors of the Wishes and More. He was also honorary chair of the American Cancer Society. LeDoux founded a golf tournament called the Scott LeDoux Long Haul Classic.

LeDoux died of complication of ALS on August 11, 2011.

Professional boxing record

|-
|align="center" colspan=8|33 Wins (22 knockouts, 11 decisions), 13 Losses (7 knockouts, 5 decisions), 4 Draws
|-
| align="center" style="border-style: none none solid solid; background: #e3e3e3"|Result
| align="center" style="border-style: none none solid solid; background: #e3e3e3"|Record
| align="center" style="border-style: none none solid solid; background: #e3e3e3"|Opponent
| align="center" style="border-style: none none solid solid; background: #e3e3e3"|Type
| align="center" style="border-style: none none solid solid; background: #e3e3e3"|Round
| align="center" style="border-style: none none solid solid; background: #e3e3e3"|Date
| align="center" style="border-style: none none solid solid; background: #e3e3e3"|Location
| align="center" style="border-style: none none solid solid; background: #e3e3e3"|Notes
|-align=center
|Loss
|33–13–4
|align=left| Frank Bruno
|TKO
|3
|03/05/1983
|align=left| Wembley Arena, Wembley, London
|
|-
|Win
|33–12–4
|align=left| Ken Arlt
|UD
|10
|07/04/1983
|align=left| Marriott Hotel, Portland, Oregon
|align=left|
|-
|Win
|32–12–4
|align=left| Larry Ware
|TKO
|7
|28/02/1983
|align=left| Edmonton, Alberta
|align=left|
|-
|Win
|31–12–4
|align=left|Steve Ward
|KO
|8
|13/11/1982
|align=left| Gillette, Minnesota
|align=left|
|-
|Win
|30–12–4
|align=left|Marlo Malino
|KO
|5
|27/10/1982
|align=left| Schollander Pavilion, West Fargo, North Dakota
|align=left|
|-
|Loss
|29–12–4
|align=left| Gordon Racette
|SD
|10
|23/09/1982
|align=left| PNE Agrodome, Vancouver, British Columbia
|
|-
|Loss
|29–11–4
|align=left| Gerrie Coetzee
|KO
|8
|27/03/1982
|align=left| Rand Stadium, Johannesburg, Gauteng
|align=left|
|-
|Win
|29–10–4
|align=left|Steve Sanchez
|KO
|8
|25/02/1982
|align=left| Sioux Falls, South Dakota
|align=left|
|-
|Loss
|28–10–4
|align=left| Greg Page
|TKO
|4
|12/11/1981
|align=left| Thomas Robinson Stadium, Nassau, Bahamas
|align=left|
|-
|Win
|28–9–4
|align=left| Arnold Sam
|PTS
|10
|30/07/1981
|align=left| Gillette, Minnesota
|align=left|
|-
|Win
|27–9–4
|align=left| Reggie Fleming
|KO
|2
|24/04/1981
|align=left| Billings, Montana
|align=left|
|-
|Loss
|26–9–4
|align=left| Larry Holmes
|TKO
|7
|07/07/1980
|align=left| Met Center, Bloomington, Minnesota
|align=left|
|-
|Win
|26–8–4
|align=left| Marty Monroe
|UD
|10
|09/03/1980
|align=left| Saint Paul Civic Center, Saint Paul, Minnesota
|align=left|
|-
|Loss
|25–8–4
|align=left| Mike Weaver
|UD
|12
|24/11/1979
|align=left| Met Center, Bloomington, Minnesota
|align=left|
|-
|style="background: #B0C4DE"|Draw
|25–7–4
|align=left| Ken Norton
|PTS
|10
|19/08/1979
|align=left| Met Center, Bloomington, Minnesota
|
|-
|Loss
|25–7–3
|align=left| Ron Lyle
|SD
|10
|12/05/1979
|align=left| Las Vegas, Nevada
|
|-
|Win
|25–6–3
|align=left| James J. Beattie
|TKO
|3
|20/02/1979
|align=left| Met Center, Bloomington, Minnesota
|align=left|
|-
|Win
|24–6–3
|align=left| Joe Donatto
|KO
|3
|15/12/1978
|align=left| Omaha Civic Auditorium, Omaha, Nebraska
|align=left|
|-
|Win
|23–6–3
|align=left| James Brown
|KO
|2
|10/11/1978
|align=left| Caesars Palace, Las Vegas, Nevada
|
|-
|Win
|22–6–3
|align=left| Sylvester Wilder
|KO
|2
|03/10/1978
|align=left| Winnipeg, Manitoba
|align=left|
|-
|style="background: #B0C4DE"|Draw
|21–6–3
|align=left| Bill Sharkey
|PTS
|10
|26/09/1978
|align=left| Miami Beach Convention Center, Miami Beach, Florida
|align=left|
|-
|style="background: #B0C4DE"|Draw
|21–6–2
|align=left| Leon Spinks
|PTS
|10
|22/10/1977
|align=left| Aladdin Theatre for the Performing Arts, Las Vegas, Nevada
|
|-
|Loss
|21–6–1
|align=left| Duane Bobick
|TKO
|8
|28/07/1977
|align=left| Met Center, Bloomington, Minnesota
|align=left|
|-
|Win
|21–5–1
|align=left| Tom Prater
|TKO
|7
|23/06/1977
|align=left| Met Center, Bloomington, Minnesota
|align=left|
|-
|Win
|20–5–1
|align=left| Pedro Soto
|SD
|10
|02/03/1977
|align=left| Madison Square Garden, New York City
|align=left|
|-
|Loss
|19–5–1
|align=left| Johnny Boudreaux
|UD
|8
|13/02/1977
|align=left| Halsey Field House, Annapolis, Maryland
|align=left|
|-
|Win
|19–4–1
|align=left| Rocky Bentley
|KO
|2
|30/11/1976
|align=left| Minneapolis, Minnesota
|align=left|
|-
|Loss
|18–4–1
|align=left| George Foreman
|TKO
|3
|14/08/1976
|align=left| Utica Memorial Auditorium, Utica, New York
|
|-
|Loss
|18–3–1
|align=left| John Dino Denis
|UD
|10
|26/06/1976
|align=left| Providence, Rhode Island
|align=left|
|-
|Loss
|18–2–1
|align=left| Duane Bobick
|UD
|10
|22/04/1976
|align=left| Met Center, Bloomington, Minnesota
|align=left|
|-
|Win
|18–1–1
|align=left| Larry Middleton
|PTS
|10
|09/03/1976
|align=left| Minneapolis, Minnesota
|align=left|
|-
|Win
|17–1–1
|align=left| Bill Carson
|KO
|9
|07/02/1976
|align=left| Minneapolis, Minnesota
|align=left|
|-
|Win
|16–1–1
|align=left| Ron Stander
|UD
|10
|10/12/1975
|align=left| Met Center, Bloomington, Minnesota
|
|-
|Win
|15–1–1
|align=left| Brian O'Melia
|UD
|10
|23/09/1975
|align=left| Saint Paul, Minnesota
|align=left|
|-
|style="background: #B0C4DE"|Draw
|14–1–1
|align=left| George Johnson
|PTS
|10
|14/08/1975
|align=left| Saint Paul Civic Center, Saint Paul, Minnesota
|align=left|
|-
|Win
|14–1
|align=left| Terry Daniels
|TKO
|6
|08/07/1975
|align=left| Orlando Sports Stadium, Orlando, Florida
|align=left|
|-
|Win
|13–1
|align=left| Rodney Bobick
|UD
|10
|23/04/1975
|align=left| Met Center, Bloomington, Minnesota
|
|-
|Loss
|12–1
|align=left| Roy Wallace
|TKO
|2
|14/03/1975
|align=left| University of Minnesota Armory, Saint Paul, Minnesota
|
|-
|Win
|12–0
|align=left| Larry Renaud
|TKO
|6
|29/01/1975
|align=left| Mayo Civic Center, Rochester, Minnesota
|align=left|
|-
|Win
|11–0
|align=left| CJ Bar Brown
|PTS
|6
|18/01/1975
|align=left| Boston Garden, Boston, Massachusetts
|align=left|
|-
|Win
|10–0
|align=left| John L Johnson
|KO
|5
|22/11/1974
|align=left| Minneapolis, Minnesota
|align=left|
|-
|Win
|9–0
|align=left| Lou Rogan
|PTS
|10
|08/11/1974
|align=left| Crosby, Minnesota
|align=left|
|-
|Win
|8–0
|align=left| Ron Draper
|KO
|10
|08/10/1974
|align=left| Minneapolis, Minnesota
|align=left|
|-
|Win
|7–0
|align=left| Tom Berry
|KO
|4
|13/08/1974
|align=left| Minneapolis Convention Center, Minneapolis, Minnesota
|align=left|
|-
|Win
|6–0
|align=left| Joe Batton
|KO
|6
|31/07/1974
|align=left| Met Center, Bloomington, Minnesota
|align=left|
|-
|Win
|5–0
|align=left| Larry Penniger
|KO
|5
|23/05/1974
|align=left| Minneapolis, Minnesota
|align=left|
|-
|Win
|4–0
|align=left| Reggie Fleming
|KO
|3
|15/05/1974
|align=left| Saint Paul Auditorium, Saint Paul, Minnesota
|align=left|
|-
|Win
|3–0
|align=left|Steve Patterson
|PTS
|6
|23/04/1974
|align=left| Minneapolis Convention Center, Minneapolis, Minnesota
|align=left|
|-
|Win
|2–0
|align=left| Floyd Cox
|TKO
|3
|14/03/1974
|align=left| Minneapolis Auditorium, Minneapolis, Minnesota
|align=left|
|-
|Win
|1–0
|align=left| Arthur Pullins
|KO
|3
|04/02/1974
|align=left| Minneapolis Convention Center, Minneapolis, Minnesota
|align=left|

Exhibition boxing record

References

External links

1949 births
2011 deaths
Boxers from Minnesota
County commissioners in Minnesota
Heavyweight boxers
Professional wrestling referees
Neurological disease deaths in the United States
Deaths from motor neuron disease
American male boxers